Solea senegalensis, the Senegalese sole, is a species of flatfish from the family of the true soles, the Soleidae, from the eastern Atlantic and the Mediterranean Sea.

Description
Solea senegalensis is very similar to the common sole and like it, it has a flattened, oval body with the dorsal fin starting on the upper profile of the head to the front of the upper eye. The dorsal fin has 73–86 rays, the anal fin has 61–74 rays and there is a well developed pectoral fin on each side of its body which has 7–10 rays. There are numerous, small, hair like fringes on the blind side of the head and the distance between the upper eye and the dorsal profile of the head is obviously greater than the diameter of the eye. The anterior nostril on the blind-side is surrounded by a small ridge but it is not enlarged. The caudal fin is attached to the last rays of the dorsal and anal fins by a narrow membrane. The lateral line is made up of 120–138 pored scales. It is greyish brown in colour on the eyed side marked with numerous blue spots, the spots tend to disappear in dead specimens.  The pectoral fin on the eyed side has a nearly black membrane contrasting with cream coloured fin rays while the caudal fin is plain. The blind side is whitish. The main identifying feature which separates this species from the common sole is the black colour of the membrane between the rays on the pectoral fin on its eyed-side whereas the common sole has a neat black spot close to the margin of the eyed side pectoral fin.  It grows to a standard length of 60 cm but is more usually 45 cm.

Distribution
Solea senegalensis occurs in the eastern Atlantic from southern Great Britain and Ireland, where it is rare, to Angola, including the Canary Islands. It entered the Mediterranean Sea via Gibraltar in the early 20th century, fast expanded in the western Basin as far east as northern Tunisia where it is an important resource and is now found in the Aegean Sea till the Sea of Marmara.

Habitat and biology
Solea senegalensis is a demersal marine flatfish which occurs on sandy or muddy bottoms, these can be in varied habitats from brackish lagoons and shallow waters to coastal regions where the water can be 100 m in depth. The adults feed mainly on small benthic invertebrates, especially polychaetes and bivalves, with some small crustaceans. Females attain sexual maturity at around 3 years of age and a total length of 32 cm. Spawning takes place during the summer peaking in June around the Iberian Peninsula and in the Bay of Biscay when the water temperature is between 15 °C and 20 °C.

Taxonomy
Over much of its range S. senegalensis is sympatric with the rather similar common sole and has been considered a subspecies by some authors in the past, Solea vulgaris melanochira. It is however more closely related to the east Mediterranean Egyptian sole (Solea aegyptiaca) than it is to the common sole, and where these two species' ranges meet there is a hybrid zone, with hybrids being detected from the Gulf of Lions and the coats of Tunisia as demonstrated in the research of Dr. Khaled Ouanes. S. senegalensis is thought to have invaded the Mediterranean from the eastern Atlantic through the Straits of Gibraltar, a phenomenon knows as Herculean migration after the Pillars of Hercules.

Human interaction
In Europe both the common sole and the Senegalese sole are landed and marketed and there is little distinction made between them in statistics. There are, however, different geographical preferences with the common sole being preferred in northern Europe and the Senegalese sole being preferred in more southerly areas and these preferences are reflected in the higher market price for common sole in northern and western Europe while Senegalese sole is more valuable in southern Europe. Off Mauritania there is an artisanal fishery for this species and the artisanal catch between 2006 and 2010 fluctuated between 117,328 kg to as low as 9,049 kg but information on fishing effort is lacking. It is widely produced in extensive aquaculture in Portugal and Spain.

The flesh is sold fresh, normally as fillets with smaller fillets going to domestic consumers and larger fillets to commercial markets such as hotels and restaurants.

References

Soleidae
Fish of the Atlantic Ocean
Fish of the Mediterranean Sea
Fish described in 1858
Taxa named by Johann Jakob Kaup